is a pharmaceutical automation company.  It was founded in 1964 in Osaka, Japan.  Since 1996 the company has had offices in United States.

References

External links

Yuyama USA Website 
Yuyama Japan Website 

Industrial machine manufacturers
Health care companies of Japan
Manufacturing companies based in Osaka
Japanese companies established in 1964
Manufacturing companies established in 1964
Japanese brands